Rodrigue Bongongui (born 7 February 1993) is a Cameroonian professional footballer who plays as a winger for Maccabi Ahi Nazareth.

References

External links

1993 births
Living people
Cameroonian footballers
Cameroonian expatriate footballers
Association football wingers
CS Sedan Ardennes players
Paris FC players
NK Slaven Belupo players
NK Tabor Sežana players
Hapoel Hadera F.C. players
Zira FK players
Maccabi Ahi Nazareth F.C. players
Championnat National 3 players
Ligue 2 players
Championnat National players
Croatian Football League players
Slovenian PrvaLiga players
Israeli Premier League players
Azerbaijan Premier League players
Liga Leumit players
Expatriate footballers in France
Expatriate footballers in Croatia
Expatriate footballers in Slovenia
Expatriate footballers in Israel
Expatriate footballers in Azerbaijan
Cameroonian expatriate sportspeople in France
Cameroonian expatriate sportspeople in Croatia
Cameroonian expatriate sportspeople in Slovenia
Cameroonian expatriate sportspeople in Israel
Cameroonian expatriate sportspeople in Azerbaijan